The Nantes Metropolis is the métropole, an intercommunal structure, centred on the city of Nantes. It is located in the Loire-Atlantique department, in the Pays de la Loire region, western France. It was created in January 2015, replacing the previous Communauté urbaine de Nantes. Its area is 523.4 km2. Its population was 636,013 in 2018, of which 314,138 in Nantes proper.

The metropolis is a member of the Nantes - Saint-Nazaire and Loire-Bretagne metropolitan clusters, as well as the Eurocities network, of which it chaired the Culture Forum in 2009.

History 
The Communauté urbaine de Nantes was founded in 2001. On January 1, 2015, the Metropolis replaced the Urban Community in accordance with a law of January 2014.

Administration 
The Metropolitan Council consists of 97 members, one of them being the president, currently Johanna Rolland, the mayor of Nantes.

Composition 
The 24 communes of the métropole are:

Nantes Métropole encompasses only the center of the metropolitan area of Nantes (see infobox at Nantes article for the metropolitan area). Communes further away from the center of the metropolitan area have formed their own intercommunal structures, such as:
 Communauté de communes d'Erdre et Gesvres
 Communauté de communes de Grand-Lieu
 Communauté de communes Sèvre et Loire
 etc.

References

External links 
 Nantes Métropole website
 Tourist office

Nantes
Nantes
Nantes